Galicia Point (or ) is the peak rising to 4480 m in Vinson Massif, Sentinel Range in Ellsworth Mountains, Antarctica, and surmounting Jacobsen Valley to the east and Branscomb Glacier to the north and west.

The peak is named after the Spanish region of Galicia in connection with the peak's ascent by the Spaniard Miguel Ángel Vidal on 28 December 2004.

Location
US mapping in 1961, 1988 and 2007.

See also
 Mountains in Antarctica

Maps

 Vinson Massif.  Scale 1:250 000 topographic map.  Reston, Virginia: US Geological Survey, 1988.
 D. Gildea and C. Rada.  Vinson Massif and the Sentinel Range.  Scale 1:50 000 topographic map.  Omega Foundation, 2007.
 Antarctic Digital Database (ADD). Scale 1:250000 topographic map of Antarctica. Scientific Committee on Antarctic Research (SCAR). Since 1993, regularly updated.

Notes

References
 Bulgarian Antarctic Gazetteer. Antarctic Place-names Commission. (details in Bulgarian, basic data in English)
 Galicia Peak. SCAR Composite Gazetteer of Antarctica.

External links
 Galicia Peak. Copernix satellite image

Bulgaria and the Antarctic
Ellsworth Mountains
Mountains of Ellsworth Land
Four-thousanders of Antarctica